The General Levelling of France (niveau général de la France or NGF)
forms a network of benchmarks in mainland France and Corsica, now overseen by the Institut Géographique National. It is now the official levelling network in mainland France. It is made up of two networks:
 NGF - IGN69 for mainland France, with the 'zero level' determined by the tide gauge at Marseille
 NGF - IGN78 for Corsica, with the 'zero level' determined by the tide gauge at Ajaccio

Topography
Geography of France